The 2017–18 VCU Rams women's basketball team represents Virginia Commonwealth University during the 2017–18 NCAA Division I women's basketball season. The Rams are led by fourth year head coach Beth O'Boyle. The Rams are members of the Atlantic 10 Conference and play their home games at the Stuart C. Siegel Center. They finished the season 7–23, 8–8 in A-10 play to finish in thirteenth place. They lost in the first round of the A-10 women's tournament Saint Joseph's.

Roster

Schedule

|-
!colspan=9 style="background:#; color:#FFFFFF;"| Non-conference regular season

|-
!colspan=9 style="background:#; color:#FFFFFF;"| A-10 regular season

|-
!colspan=9 style="background:#; color:#FFFFFF;"| Atlantic 10 Women's Tournament

Rankings
2017–18 NCAA Division I women's basketball rankings

See also
 2017–18 VCU Rams men's basketball team

References

VCU
VCU Rams women's basketball
VCU Rams women's basketball
VCU Rams women's basketball seasons